Due to the importance of surface weather observations from the surface of the ocean, the voluntary observing ship program, known as VOS, was set up to train crews how to take weather observations while at sea and also to calibrate weather sensors used aboard ships when they arrive in port, such as barometers and thermometers. An Automatic Voluntary Observing Ships (AVOS) System is an automated weather station that transmits VOS program reports.

See also

 Old Weather
 Gulf Stream#History
 AIREP
 PIREP
 Citizen Weather Observer Program
 Phenology

References

External links
The Joint WMO-IOC Technical Commission for Oceanography and Marine Meteorology (JCOMM)
JCOMM Voluntary Observing Ship Scheme
VOS on NOSA
 Australian Voluntary Observing Fleet
 Canadian Voluntary Observing Ships Program
 Dutch Voluntary Observing Ships and PMO Web Site
 Hong Kong Voluntary Observing Ships Scheme
 Indian Voluntary Observing Fleet
 United States Voluntary Observing Ship Program

Meteorological data and networks